Sergey Anatolyevich Cherny (May 11, 1977 – June 24, 2001), known as The Beast, was a Ukrainian-born Russian serial killer who killed 10 girls aged between 15 and 23 years in Smolensk from August to December 1999.

Biography 
Cherny grew up in a small house with a disabled mother, his younger brother Mark and his sister. Since childhood he was engaged in sports, and was the champion of the Smolensk Oblast in martial arts. Having gone into the army, he served in an elite battalion of deep reconnaissance. After his return, he learned that his brother had joined a criminal group in Smolensk. He did not follow in his footsteps, and began to work as a security guard in one of the markets of Smolensk. Cherny had a habit of wearing both winter and summer camouflage uniforms. In his own words, "his girlfriends did not [wait] for him to return from the army and got married." After this, he decided to take revenge.

In August 1999, Cherny attacked a girl, hitting her and pushing her into the bushes, and trying to strangle her. However, the girl cried out, and when he saw that a man was approaching, Cherny ran away. On September 19, Cherny strangled a girl in the vicinity of the town of Komintern, who was going to a disco. He took off her outer garments and pulled the earrings from her ears. The body was soon found in a ravine near the place of the murder. On September 24, Cherny also killed another girl at the spring in the Redovka Park in the same way. At her neck, a bra was tied tightly in a knot. The deceased had lost a leather jacket, leather waistcoat, a breastplate, a bunch of keys and a ticket. On September 27, in the village of Vishenka, in an abandoned warehouse, the corpse of a girl was found, with signs of strangulation, who went missing on September 24. On the neck a belt from the jacket was tied in two knots. On September 29, in front of GSK "Tikhvinka-3" the body of another strangled girl was found. A loop of thin strap from a purse was fastened around her neck and tied back to two knots. UVD Smolensk seriously engaged in the disclosure of the murder series, and the killer, feeling the danger, "fell to the bottom", not betraying himself and not committing new atrocities. A month later, the murderer reappeared, strangling two more girls in three days. On November 4, near the Yasennaya River, which flowed in the ravine between the village of Vishenka and the garage-building cooperative "Svet-2", a corpse of a girl was found, photographs of whom were hanging on search trays for two days around the city. On the neck of the deceased, the murderer had tied handkerchief and a belt from his coat tightly around her neck, and her outer clothing, a gold ring, earrings and a watch were stolen. On November 6, in the forest belt in the nuclear power plant-80 area, half a kilometer from the Krasninskoe highway, the body of another victim was found, and had lost her passport and student card. On November 22, Cherny met a girl in the city centre. The next day, he invited her to go on a walk and get some fresh air, to which she agreed. When they met, they got into his car and went for a drive. Suddenly, Cherny attacked the companion, tried to strangle her, then threw her into the trunk and drove her to the outskirts, where he hung her from a tree with her own sneakers' shoelaces. However, the girl survived and soon turned to the police, but because of the shock experienced, she was confused and could not provide any valuable information. In early December, the investigators managed to find the victim who survived the August attack, who said that she had seen the criminal in one of the city's markets. For several days she was taken to the markets of Smolensk, and on December 14 she pointed the detectives on the man who attacked her. The suspect was placed on surveillance round the clock, including using a hidden camera. When they looked through the record with the suspect's image, one of the detectives said that he knew a very similar person - a member of a local criminal group named Mark Cherny. It turned out that Mark was the younger brother of the main suspect - a 22-year-old security guard of a private security company Sergey Cherny. Meanwhile, corpses were still found around the city. On December 17, in the ravine for GSK "Zvezda" in the second Krasninskiy lane the corpse of another girl was found with a leather belt from a coat tied on two knots around her neck. On December 22 near the Yasennaya River in the "Readovka" park another corpse was found. Subsequently, the Cherny brothers were detained.

Arrest 
On December 23, almost simultaneously, with a difference of half an hour, both brothers were detained. In the apartments where Mark and Sergey lived, a search was conducted, and as a result of which a red jacket from one of the victims was found in Sergey's apartment, which was a shock to the killer himself. At the first interrogation it was revealed that he did not have an alibi for any of the murders.

With a more thorough search of Cherny's apartment, jewels from the murdered girls and firearms unrelated to the case were found. Cherny soon confessed to everything, and even reported two more murders. One of them was committed in mid-August, and the other - in late October. Among other things, Cherny confessed to another murder, telling how he drowned one victim in a creek, which law enforcement considered an accident first. But Cherny's fault in this death was later questioned.

Cherny was sent for a forensic medical examination, with the second exam result diagnosing him with schizophrenia. He was sent for compulsory treatment in a special psychiatric hospital. On June 24, 2001, Cherny died from pneumonia.

In the media 
 Documentary film "The Black Ribbon" from the series "Criminal Russia" (2002)
 Documentary "Diagnosis: The Maniac" (2004)/ Top Secret. Maniacs. Documentary investigation (October 16, 2012)

See also
 List of Russian serial killers
 List of serial killers by number of victims

References 

1977 births
2001 deaths
Deaths from pneumonia in Russia
Male serial killers
People acquitted by reason of insanity
People from Smolensk
People with schizophrenia
Russian murderers of children
Russian serial killers